Dusk Till Dawn is the fifth studio album by American R&B singer Bobby V. The album was released on October 16, 2012, by Blu Kolla Dreams and Entertainment One. The album features guest appearances from Lil Wayne, Red Café, K. Michelle, Future, Gucci Mane, and Cassidy.

Recording and Production 
Bobby V began recording the album in 2011 and finished recording in 2012 at 3MG Studios, Atlanta, GA; The Blue Room Recording Studios and Atlanta, GA.

Singles 
In May 2012, Bobby V released the first single from his album, titled "Mirror," which features rapper Lil Wayne. It was produced by K.E. on the Track and written by Bobby V, Lil Wayne, Kevin Erondu and Ryan Hirt. The music video premiered on Vevo on July 26, 2012, directed by Rob Dade.

In October 2012, Bobby V released the second single from his album, titled "Rock Body" Produced by Jeffrey "J Leron" Toney and written by Bobby V, Jeffrey Toney, Radric Davis and Ryan Hirt. The music video premiered on YouTube on October 11, 2012, directed by 2-Mill and was filmed in midtown Atlanta at Ramsey's Beauty Salon/Barbershop.

Bobby V released a video for the song "Role Play" featuring Red Café on November 13, 2012 on Vevo. In November 2012, Kontrol Magazine released a behind the scenes of the video for "Put it In" featuring singer K. Michelle. On January 15, 2013, the music video for "Put It In" featuring K. Michelle was released.

Commercial performance 
The album debuted at No. 91 on the US Billboard 200 chart, with first-week sales of 5,000 copies in the United States.

Track listing

Personnel 

Managerial

Bobby "V" Wilson - A&R, Executive Producer, Producer               
Courtney Stewart "Court Luv" -	A&R, Executive Producer              
Julia Sutowski	- Coordinating Producer                              
The Platinum Brothers - Producer                                    
Jeffrey "J Leron" Toney - Producer                                  
Kevin Erondu - Producer                                             
DJ Frank E - Producer                                               
Brittany Coney - Producer                                           
Luke Austin - Producer

Bill Jabr - Instrumentation, Producer  
Patrick "Guitarboy" Hayes - Instrumentation, Producer   
Ryan Hirt - A&R      
Danielle Harwood - A&R
Roger "Mista Raja" Greene - A&R   
Bekah Connolly - A&R
Brendan Laezza - Marketing
Chris Herche - Marketing          

Performance Credits

Red Café - 
Ursula Yancy - Vocals (Background)
Lil Wayne

Ashlee Chane'l - Vocals (Background)
Gucci Mane
Future 

Visuals and Imagery

Zach Wolfe - Photography
Andrew Kelley	 Art Direction, Design
Giovanna Melchiorre - Publicity

Hanif Sumner - Publicity
Shawnte Crespo - Product Manager

Instruments

Murphy Mitchell - Piano
Bob Rob - Drum Programming
Andy Haller - Mixing, Soloist, Spanish Guitar

Markeith Black - Guitar

Technical and production

Micah Wyatt - Assistant Engineer
James Kang - Engineer, Mixing
Gary Edwards - Engineer
Keith Dawson -	Engineer, Mixing

John Horesco IV - Mastering
C. Stewart - Composer
J. Denny - Composer
J. Franks - Composer
Paul Grosso - Creative Director

Charts

References

2012 albums
Bobby V albums
Albums produced by Tim & Bob
Albums produced by DJ Frank E